Peter Leslie Smith (born February 8, 1958) is a South African-born prelate of the Roman Catholic Church in the United States.  Since 2014, he has served as the auxiliary bishop of the Archdiocese of Portland in Oregon.

Biography

Early life 
Peter Smith was born in Pietermaritzburg, South Africa, on February 8, 1958, and was educated in the local schools. He earned a bachelor's degree and a law degree from the University of Natal in South Africa. Smith immigrated to the United States in 1986. He received a Master of Divinity degree from Mount Angel Seminary in Saint Benedict, Oregon, and a Bachelor of Sacred Theology degree from Pontifical Atheneum of St. Anselm in Rome.

Priest 
Smith was ordained a priest for the Archdiocese of Portland on June 9, 2001, by Archbishop John Vlazny. After his ordination, Smith served as the parochial vicar at Our Lady of the Lake Parish in Lake Oswego, Oregon from 2001 to 2004.  He took a leave of absence from the archdiocese to study at The Catholic University of America in Washington, D.C. where he received a Licentiate of Canon Law in 2006.

From 2006 to 2013, Smith served as pastor of St. Rose of Lima Parish in Portland, Oregon.  Smith also served as the adjutant judicial vicar from 2010 to 2014, then as vicar general and moderator of the curia for the archdiocese starting in 2013.  He served as the archdiocesan liaison for the Catholic Charismatic Renewal, and he is a member of the Brotherhood of the People of Praise, a charismatic association of priests in the archdiocese.

Auxiliary Bishop of Portland 
Pope Francis named Smith as the titular bishop of Tubunae in Mauretania and auxiliary bishop of the Archdiocese of Portland on March 4, 2014. He was ordained in St. Mary's Cathedral of the Immaculate Conception in Portland on April 29, 2014, by Archbishop Alexander Sample. Archbishop Emeritus John Vlazny and Bishop Liam Cary were the principal co-consecrators. Upon his election, the Survivors Network of those Abused by Priests released a statement expressing disappointment about the appointment as "another civil and canonical lawyer" (KOIN, Channel 6, 2014).

See also

 Catholic Church hierarchy
 Catholic Church in the United States
 Historical list of the Catholic bishops of the United States
 List of Catholic bishops of the United States
 Lists of patriarchs, archbishops, and bishops

References

External links
 Roman Catholic Archdiocese of Portland Official Site

1958 births
Living people
People from Pietermaritzburg
University of Natal alumni
Mount Angel Seminary
Catholic University of America alumni
Pontifical Atheneum of St. Anselm alumni
Roman Catholic Archdiocese of Portland in Oregon
21st-century American Roman Catholic titular bishops
South African emigrants to the United States
People of Praise
Bishops appointed by Pope Francis